The Ships That Meet is a 1916 Swedish silent drama film directed by Victor Sjöström.

Cast
 Lili Bech as Ethel
 Egil Eide as John Hall
 Mathias Taube as Dr. Hiller
 August Warberg as Cramer

References

External links

1916 films
Swedish drama films
Swedish silent short films
1910s Swedish-language films
Swedish black-and-white films
1916 drama films
1916 short films
Films directed by Victor Sjöström
Silent drama films